The Electoral Count Reform and Presidential Transition Improvement Act of 2022 is a revision of the Electoral Count Act of 1887, adding to procedures set out in the Constitution of the United States for the counting of electoral votes following a presidential election.

It was passed and enacted by the 117th Congress and President Joe Biden in December 2022 as part of the Consolidated Appropriations Act, 2023.

Legislative history 
It was sponsored by Senator Susan Collins of Maine and Senator Joe Manchin of West Virginia.  After about a year of negotiations, it became Division P of the Consolidated Appropriations Act, 2023, which passed 68–29 in the Senate on December 22, 2022, and 225–201 in the House the following day. On December 29, 2022, it was signed into law by President Joe Biden.

Provisions 
Some of the highlights of the bill include:

 Identifying each state's governor as responsible for submitting certificates of ascertainment, unless otherwise specified by state laws or constitutions.
 Providing for expedited review, including a three-judge panel with a direct appeal to the Supreme Court, of certain claims related to a state’s certificate identifying its electors.
 Requiring Congress to defer to slates of electors submitted by a state’s executive pursuant to the judgments of state or federal courts.
 Clarifying that the vice president cannot solely determine, accept, reject, or otherwise adjudicate disputes over electors.
 Raising objection threshold from one member of each chamber to 20% of each chamber.
 Prohibiting state legislatures from declaring a "failed election" to override the popular vote. They can now move their election only due to “force majeure events that are extraordinary and catastrophic”.

References 

United States federal election legislation
United States Electoral College
Acts of the 117th United States Congress
Presidency of Joe Biden
Riders to United States federal appropriations legislation

External links